Console may refer to:

Computing and video games 
 System console, a physical device to operate a computer
 Virtual console, a user interface for multiple computer consoles on one device
 Command-line interface, a method of interacting with a computer
 Console applications are programs designed to be used via a text-only computer interface
 Terminal emulator, a program that substitutes for a computer console or computer terminal
 Win32 console, the terminal emulator of Microsoft Windows
 Video game console, a specific device for playing video games
 Home video game console, a specific home device for playing video games
 Handheld game console, a specific lightweight and portable device for playing video games
 Console (Mac OS X), a log viewer on OS X
 Console (video game CLI), a command-line user interface element for personal computer games originating in Quake
 Console Inc., an American technology startup company
 Konsole, a computer terminal emulator program for the K Desktop Environment

Music 
 Console (musician), an electronic music project by Martin Gretschmann
 Console tape recorder, also used for computer tape
 Mixing console, a device for controlling and combining audio signals
 Organ console, which includes the keys, stops, and foot pedals for playing music
 Timpani console

Other uses 
 Console (architecture), a support element of a construction such as a balcony
 Console (charity), an Irish suicide bereavement charity which closed due to a mismanagement controversy
 Console (heraldry), a frame supporting a heraldic shield
 Console, a verb describing the offering of consolation
 Center console (automobile)
 Console table, a table supported by corbels designed to be placed against a wall
 Entertainment console, a type of home entertainment center, with various home electronics housed in a self-contained unit
 Lighting control console, a device for controlling theatrical lighting

See also 
 Consol (disambiguation)
 Consols Consolidated Stock, variety of British government financial bond
 Glove compartment